The Second Federal Electoral District of Baja California Sur (II Distrito Electoral Federal de Baja California Sur) is one of the 300 Electoral Districts into which Mexico is divided for the purpose of elections to the federal Chamber of Deputies and one of two such districts in the state of Baja California Sur.

It elects one deputy to the lower house of Congress for each three-year legislative period, by means of the first past the post system.

District territory
It covers the municipality of Los Cabos and the easternmost third of the municipality of La Paz. The district's head town (cabecera distrital), where results from individual polling stations are gathered together and collated, is the state capital, La Paz.

Deputies returned to Congress from this district

L Legislature
 1976–1979: Agapito Duarte Hernández (PRI)
LI Legislature
 1979–1982:
LII Legislature
 1982–1985:
LIII Legislature
 1985–1988: Eligio Soto López (PRI)
LIV Legislature
 1988–1991: Antonio Manríquez Guluarte (PRI)
LV Legislature
 1991–1994: Mario Vargas Aguiar (PRI)
LVI Legislature
 1994–1997: Rodimiro Amaya Téllez (PRI)
LVII Legislature
 1997–2000: Antonio Manríquez Guluarte (PRI)
LVIII Legislature
 2000–2003: Rosa Delia Cota Montaño (PT)
LIX Legislature
 2003–2004: Narciso Agúndez Montaño (PRD)
 2004–2006: Josefina Cota Cota (PRD)
LX Legislature
 2006–2009: Víctor Manuel Lizárraga Peraza (PRD)

Federal electoral districts of Mexico
Baja California Sur